

	

Kohinoor is a locality in the Australian state of South Australia located on Kangaroo Island about  south-west of the state capital of Adelaide and about  south-east of the municipal seat of Kingscote.  

Its boundaries were created in March 2002 for the “long established name” which was derived from Kohinoor Hill, a hill located within the locality’s boundaries.

Kohinoor is bounded in part by the Playford Highway to the north.   The principal land use in the locality is primary production.

Kohinoor is located within the federal division of Mayo, the state electoral district of Mawson and the local government area of the Kangaroo Island Council.

See also
Kohinoor (disambiguation)

References
Notes

Citations

Towns on Kangaroo Island